is a private university in Yaizu city, Shizuoka Prefecture, Japan, established in 2004.

Departments 
The university specializes in social welfare programmes, and currently has five departments:

 Department of Psychology in Social Welfare
 Department of Medicine in Social Welfare
 Department of Health in Social Welfare
 Department of Informatics in Social Welfare
 Department of Care and Welfare

External links 
 Official website 

Educational institutions established in 2004
Private universities and colleges in Japan
Universities and colleges in Shizuoka Prefecture
Yaizu, Shizuoka
2004 establishments in Japan